Justice Ewing may refer to:

Charles Ewing (politician) (1780–1832), chief justice of the New Jersey Supreme Court
Ephraim Brevard Ewing (1819–1873), associate justice of the Supreme Court of Missouri